The 1999 UEFA Intertoto Cup finals were won by Montpellier, Juventus, and West Ham United. All three teams advanced to the UEFA Cup.

Qualified teams

First round

First leg

Second leg

Ventspils won 2–1 on aggregate.

Sint-Truiden won 8–1 on aggregate.

Polonia Warsaw won 4–0 on aggregate.

4–4 on aggregate. Pobeda won 4–3 on penalties.

2–2 on aggregate, Rudar Velenje won on away goals rule.

MŠK Žilina won 4–0 on aggregate.

Ararat Yerevan won 2–0 on aggregate.

Varteks won 4–3 on aggregate.

Vasas won 7–1 on aggregate.

Neuchâtel Xamax won 2–0 on aggregate.

Ceahlăul Piatra Neamţ won 2–0 on aggregate.

1–1 on aggregate, Gomel won 3–1 on penalties.

Newry Town won 2–1 on aggregate.

2–2 on aggregate, Qarabağ won on away goals rule.

Cementarnica 55 won 8–2 on aggregate.

Basel won 6–0 on aggregate.

Jedinstvo Bihać won 3–1 on aggregate.

Floriana won 4–3 on aggregate.

ÍA won 6–3 on aggregate.

Jokerit won 7–1 on aggregate.

Second round

First leg

Second leg

Perugia won 1–0 on aggregate.

Duisburg won 2–1 on aggregate.

Basel won 4–2 on aggregate.

Rostselmash won 3–2 on aggregate.

3–3 on aggregate; Varteks won 5–4 on penalties

Austria Lustenau won 4–2 on aggregate.

Lokeren won 6–2 on aggregate.

Metz won 4–2 on aggregate.

Polonia Warsaw won 4–1 on aggregate.

Hammarby won 6–2 on aggregate.

Kocaelispor won 3–1 on aggregate.

Kocaelispor won 9–0 on aggregate.

Sint-Truiden won 5–1 on aggregate.

Vasas won 3–0 on aggregate.

Jokerit won 3–0 on aggregate.

Ceahlăul Piatra Neamţ won 5–2 on aggregate.

Third round

First leg

Second leg

Montpellier won 4–1 on aggregate.

1–1 on aggregate, Juventus won on away goals rule.

The game was abandoned in the 114th minute of extra time due to some objects being thrown on the pitch, some even hitting the referee. UEFA banned Perugia and awarded a 3–0 win to Trabzonspor.

Trabzonspor won 4–2 on aggregate.
 

West Ham United won 2–1 on aggregate.

Heerenveen won 4–0 on aggregate.
 

2–2 on aggregate, Rennes won on away goals rule.

3–3 on aggregate, Hamburg won on away goals rule.

Austria Wien won 3–2 on aggregate.

2–2 on aggregate, Rostselmash won on away goals rule.

Duisburg won 3–0 on aggregate.

2–2 on aggregate, Metz won on away goals rule.

Polonia Warsaw won 4–1 on aggregate.

Semi-finals

First leg

Second leg

Montpellier won 3–1 on aggregate.

Hamburger SV won 6–3 on aggregate.

Juventus won 9–1 on aggregate.

Rennes won 4–2 on aggregate.

West Ham United won 2–0 on aggregate.

Metz won 6–2 on aggregate.

Finals

First leg

Second leg

2–2 on aggregate; Montpellier won 3–0 on penalties

West Ham United won 3–2 on aggregate.

Juventus won 4–2 on aggregate.

See also
1999–2000 UEFA Champions League
1999–2000 UEFA Cup

References

External links
Official site
Results at RSSSF

UEFA Intertoto Cup
3